Jonah Jeremiah "JJ" Jones is a fictional character in the British teen drama Skins and is portrayed by Ollie Barbieri. He was introduced in the third series as a socially inept teenager who was a long-time friend of both Freddie McClair and James Cook. JJ is notable for having Asperger's and was a virgin when the series started. However, as series three and four progress, JJ becomes more socially confident. He is the only character in the third and fourth series to appear in every episode.

Characterization
JJ is a friend of Cook and Freddie who dub themselves The Three Musketeers. He is very well spoken, articulate and excels academically, particularly in maths and science. He has Asperger's, and although he can understand some social cues, such as humour and sarcasm and is able to interact with his friends normally, he has difficulty interacting with strangers and controlling his emotions, and is extremely sensitive to sensory stimulation. As a result, he finds it difficult to make friends outside of his main circle, and is prone to becoming stressed and disorientated when in a large crowd of people, an intense party atmosphere, or an awkward situation - which he refers to as being "locked on". He often needs a friend come to his rescue, such as in his self-titled episode in series three and Pandora's episode. Because of this, he has been put on various medications geared towards making him appear more neurotypical (although this is not common medical practice for autism alone). JJ is interested in magic tricks, and his proficiency in magic is something that allows him to be accepted by the rest of the gang, most of whom view him with a mixture of affection, amusement and mild irritation. JJ becomes close to Emily Fitch, who finds him to be a source of support for her own issues and in turn helps him with his. Because of this, he is the first person to whom she confides about her closeted homosexuality, and she in turn has sex with him, so that he may lose his virginity. This is in sharp contrast to the unkindness her more judgemental sister, Katie, shows him.

JJ often acts as a mediator whenever Freddie and Cook fight. Although he was in love with her in series three, he also grew to dislike Effy, seeing her as the cause for the break-up of Freddie and Cook's friendship. He forms a close friendship with Thomas Tomone in series four, who proves instrumental in getting JJ his first real girlfriend, Lara.

Character history

Series 3
JJ first appears in "Everyone" when he meets best friends Freddie and Cook before starting their first day at Roundview College. There he often goes unnoticed despite his magic tricks and articulate speech. He, along with Freddie and Cook become infatuated with Effy. In "Cook", JJ manages to impress the gang with a magic stunt involving a goldfish, which Cook spoils. Cook persuades JJ to accompany him to a brothel where JJ nervously asks for a kiss from a prostitute. In "Pandora", JJ and Cook attempt to sneak into Pandora's "girls only" party. After Cook goes in, JJ goes in himself only to find Emily and Naomi kissing. The party turns into a massive house party when Katie's boyfriend and his football mates come round. JJ calls Freddie to get him out of the party after he gets "locked on". Freddie arrives and takes him home.

In "Freddie", JJ witnesses Effy's destructive influence over his closest friends. He performs an elaborate fire eating stunt which impresses Effy, Freddie and Cook. He votes against Karen in a reality television program, under Cook's instructions, as revenge against her stealing Freddie's shed, a previous popular hang out place for the gang. However, this sparks a violent confrontation between Freddie and Cook. In "Naomi", JJ proves a useful asset in helping Cook's sixth form President campaign.

In JJ's centric episode, his autism and his temperament are made clear. He regularly attends a clinic where he requires heavy medication, here he also expresses his fury at Effy's manipulation of both Freddie and Cook. At the clinic, he meets Emily who is receiving counselling, and the two discuss their woes outside the clinic. She confides to him about her homosexuality, and he in turn confesses his desire to be normal, shocking her with the number of drugs he has been prescribed. He also expresses his fury that the friendship he had shared with Freddie and Cook has been destroyed the love triangle caused by Effy. At Emily's urging, he stands up to Freddie over his treatment of him, accidentally revealing Emily's homosexuality to her twin sister Katie in the process. He then confronts Effy about her role in destroying a friendship he prized so much and confesses his love for her. Effy, seeing the impact she has had on his life, is apologetic and suggests they become friends, and is hurt when he coldly refuses. When he goes to confront Cook, he accidentally discovers that he is continuing his affair with Pandora, though he does not reveal this to anyone else. Seeing that Cook is, like Freddie, indifferent to his own feelings, JJ explodes at him over it. Cook, moved by this, gives him a hug and invites him to buy drugs, which subsequently gets busted. Cook and JJ escape and Cook, desperate for drugs, takes JJ's new medication on JJ's suggestion. JJ, however, did this because he knew that the drug is designed to both calm someone down and make them more honest. As a result, at a party Cook settles into a relaxed state, which surprises the gang, and reveals his affair with Pandora, which Pandora's boyfriend Thomas overhears. Cook also reveals Effy loves Freddie. JJ leaves the party and finds a distraught Emily whom he allows her to stay at his place after her argument with Katie. She in turn offers to take his virginity which JJ nervously accepts, and the two have sex. The next morning he introduces Emily to his mother (portrayed by Juliet Cowan) who is relieved to see that her son finally made a good friend.

In "Effy" JJ accompanies the gang (minus Cook) on a camping trip. When Cook invites himself along the gang reveal their true feelings about him, including JJ who states they are no longer friends after the way Cook had been treating him. In "Katie and Emily", JJ sees Emily through her disguise as her sister in an exam, but does not tell anyone else. Later on, he and Freddie meet the Fitch sisters while buying clothes for the college prom. Emily is horrified when JJ reveals he told Freddie about their fling. Freddie mentions it to Katie, who is equally shocked. Katie then reveals Emily and JJ's fling to Naomi, who is upset. This causes a fight between the Fitch sisters.

In the series finale, While at work with Freddie he gets into an argument with when he says that it's fine refuting this saying angrily that nothing's fine and resigns from his job and walking out on Freddie. JJ then encounters Effy's mum, Anthea who reveals her sadness at not having Effy around who has run off with Cook. After Freddie receives a call from Effy, JJ pressures him to find her, accompanying him along the way. Cook challenges Freddie and JJ to a race, the winner is allowed to keep Effy. JJ wins the race using his intelligence, and as a result he forces Effy to admit she is in love with Freddie and not Cook, which upsets the latter. They flee the town on Cook's dad's boat.

Series 4
In "Thomas", the series opener, JJ attempts to make the gang seem happier despite the suicide of Sophia, Effy's refusal to return to college and Thomas’ strained relationship with Pandora hanging over them. JJ concedes that Effy's disappearance is affecting the "Three Musketeers". In "Emily", JJ tries to break up a fight between Cook and a fellow party-goer, Shanky Jenkins only for Cook to head butt him in rage, although Cook did not see JJ at the time. This upsets JJ and Freddie, the latter confronting Cook about it.

In subsequent episodes, JJ develops a close friendship with Thomas as Cook is arrested and Freddie spends more time with Effy. This highlights JJ's developing maturity and his ability to make other friends.

In "JJ", JJ asks out Lara Lloyd (played by Georgia Henshaw), a fellow co-worker at a confectionery store. Thomas pressures JJ to do this after he concedes he has developed feelings for her. Before the date, Freddie forces a recently escaped Cook onto JJ who is not pleased to see him. JJ allows Cook to stay at his in exchange for some dating tips. JJ discovers Lara is a single mother and her baby, Albert, is fathered by her previous boyfriend Liam. Liam catches JJ with Albert and demonstrates his overly protective attitude for his son. The date does not go well, largely because of Cook's poor dating advice. However, Lara reciprocates JJ's feelings and they make love at her house. Liam sees JJ at a clinic receiving his medication.

JJ takes Lara to meet Emily and Naomi. Emily confides to JJ that Lara could be using JJ to get back at Liam; JJ refutes this by stating they have trust in their relationship, something Emily and Naomi lacks. This brings Emily to tears. JJ later takes Lara to meet his parents but this does not go as well. JJ's mother, via a Freudian slip, mentions that she thinks Lara is a slut. This, along with JJ and his mother arguing over the bathroom door being locked causes Lara to leave, and JJ reveals Cook is hiding in the bathroom. Liam confronts JJ at the confectionery store, demanding to know about his medication. JJ angrily lashes out at Liam which prompts a watching Lara to break up with him. JJ later apologises to Liam who admits his protectiveness is of his son. He does ask JJ to take care of Lara. JJ, with the help of his friends, manages to win Lara back.

After his centric episode, JJ makes fewer appearances but is usually seen at parties with the gang. Lara makes no more appearances, but JJ is sometimes seen with Albert, suggesting they are still together.

In "Effy", the gang receives their A-Level results, and JJ scores very well; 2 A's and a B. JJ is last seen at Freddie's shed partying with the rest of the group.

External links
JJ Jones on the official E4 Skins site

Skins (British TV series) characters
Fictional English people
Fictional stage magicians
Television characters introduced in 2009
Fictional characters on the autism spectrum
Male characters in television
Teenage characters in television
British male characters in television